The following is a comprehensive discography of Scout Niblett, an English indie rock singer-songwriter. Niblett has released six studio albums, beginning in 2001.

Studio albums

Extended plays

Singles

Split singles

Miscellaneous appearances

References

Discographies of British artists